David Meader (born October 26, 1949) is an American politician in the state of New Hampshire. He is a member of the New Hampshire House of Representatives, sitting as a Democrat from the Cheshire 6 district, having been first elected in 2016. He previously served from 1996 to 2004 and 2008–2012.

References

Living people
1949 births
People from Keene, New Hampshire
Democratic Party members of the New Hampshire House of Representatives
20th-century American politicians
21st-century American politicians